Adalberto Costa Júnior (born 8 May 1962) is an Angolan politician, current president of UNITA and a member of the National Assembly of Angola.

He trained in electrotechnical engineering at the Instituto Superior de Engenharia do Porto and in public ethics at the Pontifical Gregorian University in Rome.

He has campaigned against public corruption. He was the godson of Jonas Savimbi.

In November 2019, Júnior was elected as president of the UNITA, ending Isaias Samakuva's 16-year term.

References

External links

Living people
Angolan politicians
Members of the National Assembly (Angola)
UNITA politicians
1962 births
People from Bié Province
Pontifical Gregorian University alumni
Leaders of political parties in Angola